Grosmannia is a genus of fungi in the family Ophiostomataceae. It was circumscribed by G. Goidànich in 1936.

The genus name of Grosmannia is in honour of Helene Margarete Amalie Francke-Grosmann (1900 - 1990), who was a German botanist (Mycology) and Phytopathologist.

The genus was circumscribed by Gabriele Goidànich in Boll. Staz. Patol. Veg. Roma ser.2, Vol.16 on page 31 in 1936.

Species
Grosmannia abiocarpa
Grosmannia aenigmatica
Grosmannia americana
Grosmannia aurea
Grosmannia cainii
Grosmannia clavigera
Grosmannia crassivaginata
Grosmannia cucullata
Grosmannia davidsonii
Grosmannia dryocoetis
Grosmannia europhioides
Grosmannia francke-grosmanniae
Grosmannia galeiformis
Grosmannia huntii
Grosmannia laricis
Grosmannia olivacea
Grosmannia pseudoeurophioides
Grosmannia robusta
Grosmannia sagmatospora
Grosmannia wageneri

References

External links

Sordariomycetes genera
Ophiostomatales